The 2011 China League One is the eighth season of the China League One, the second tier of the Chinese football league pyramid, since its establishment. It began on 26 March 2011 and ended in October 2011.

The size of the league expanded from 13 to 14 teams for this season.

Teams

Promotion and relegation 
Guangzhou Evergrande as champions of the 2010 season and Chengdu Blades as runners-up were promoted to the 2011 Chinese Super League. They were replaced by Chongqing Lifan and Changsha Ginde (Now named Shenzhen Phoenix), who were relegated from the 2010 Chinese Super League after finishing the season in the bottom two places of the table.

Nanjing Yoyo were relegated to the 2011 China League Two after finishing the 2010 season in last place. Due to a league expansion, two teams were admitted into the 2011 League One. These were the two 2010 League Two promotion final winners, Dalian Aerbin and Tianjin Songjiang.

Name changes
Beijing Baxy&Shengshi changed their name to Beijing Baxy. Hubei Luyin changed their name to Hubei Wuhan Zhongbo. Yanbian F.C. changed their name to Yanbian Changbai Tiger. In other team changes, League Two club Guizhou Zhicheng merged with Shanghai Zobon, acquiring Pudong's League One license in the process. Furthermore, minor-league club Tianjin Runyulong purchased Anhui Jiufang and their League One license in a similar merger. Both Guizhou Zhicheng and Tianjin Runyulong will make their debut at the second level of Chinese football. Changsha Ginde was purchased by MAZAMBA and moved to the city of Shenzhen, and the name was changed to Shenzhen Phoenix. At June 2011, Shenzhen Phoenix was purchased by Guangzhou R&F Properties Co. Ltd. again, the club's name changed to Guangzhou R&F F.C. and moved to the city of Guangzhou. In July 2011, Tianjin Runyulong F.C. moved to the city of Shenyang and the name was changed to Shenyang Shenbei.

Clubs

Stadiums and locations

Foreign players

League table

Positions by round

Results

Relegation play-off
2011 China League One 14th-placed Guizhou Zhicheng faces 2011 China League Two 3rd-placed team Fujian Smart Hero for a play-off match. The winner Fujian Smart Hero earn a spot in the 2012 China League One.

Top scorers 
Updated to games played on 30 October 2011.

References

External links 
Official site 
League One at Sina.com 

China League One seasons
2
China
China